Purshia (bitterbrush or cliff-rose) is a small genus of 5–8 species of flowering plants in the family Rosaceae which are native to western North America.

Description 
The flowers are 1–2 cm in diameter, with five white to pale yellow or pink petals and yellow stamens. The fruit is a cluster of dry, slender, leathery achenes which are 2–6 cm long. The roots have nodules that host nitrogen-fixing Frankia bacterium.

Taxonomy

Taxonomic history
The genus was originally placed in the subfamily Rosoideae. In the past, the evergreen species were treated separately in the genus Cowania; this genus is still accepted by some botanists.

Modern classification
The classification of Purshia within the family Rosaceae has been unclear. It is now placed in the subfamily Dryadoideae.

Species
Purshia comprises the following species:
 Purshia ericifolia (Torr. ex A.Gray) Henr. – Heath cliffrose (Texas)
 Purshia glandulosa Curran – Desert bitterbrush (Nevada, Utah, Arizona)
 Purshia mexicana (D.Don) Henr. – Mexican cliffrose (Mexico, Arizona)
 Purshia pinkavae Schaack – Pinkava's cliffrose (Arizona)
 Purshia plicata (D.Don) Henrard (syn. Cowania plicata) – Antelope bush (Nuevo León, Mexico).
 Purshia stansburyana (Torr.) Henr. – Stansbury cliffrose (Idaho south to California, Arizona and New Mexico)
 Purshia tridentata (Pursh) DC. – Antelope bitterbrush (British Columbia south to California and New Mexico)

Hybrids
The following hybrid has been described:
 Purshia × subintegra (Kearney) Henr. (P. pinkavae × P. stansburyana) – (Arizona)

Species names with uncertain taxonomic status
The status of the following species and hybrids is unresolved:
 Purshia ciliata Dennst.
 Purshia mollis  Lehm.
 Purshia plicata (D.Don) Henr.
 Purshia subintegra (Kearney) Henrickson

Distribution and habitat
The genus is native to western North America, where the species grow in dry climates from southeast British Columbia, Canada, south throughout the western United States to northern Mexico.

Gallery

References

External links
 
Jepson Flora Project: Purshia — (click 'taxon' to see treatments of California native species)

 
Rosaceae genera